Sylvain Chicoine (born July 19, 1970) was a Canadian politician, who was elected to the House of Commons of Canada in the 2011 election. He represented the electoral district of Châteauguay—Saint-Constant as a member of the New Democratic Party.

Prior to being elected, he worked as a Special Constable at the Université de Montréal and has a diploma in police technology from Collège de Maisonneuve.

References

External links

Members of the House of Commons of Canada from Quebec
New Democratic Party MPs
Living people
1970 births
Canadian police officers
21st-century Canadian politicians